St. Mary of the Angels Motherhouse Complex is a historic Roman Catholic convent located in the Town of Amherst in Erie County, New York.  It was designed in 1928 by Dietel and Wade, who also designed Buffalo City Hall, as an expansion of the Amherst headquarters of the Sisters of St. Francis. It served the sisters until 1998, when the property was transferred to the State of New York and Town of Amherst for public park use. In 2004, the structure opened as a senior housing facility.

It was listed on the National Register of Historic Places in 2002.

References

External links

St. Mary of the Angels Motherhouse Complex - U.S. National Register of Historic Places on Waymarking.com

Convents in the United States
Properties of religious function on the National Register of Historic Places in New York (state)
Gothic Revival architecture in New York (state)
Religious buildings and structures completed in 1928
Buildings and structures in Erie County, New York
National Register of Historic Places in Erie County, New York